Rein Baart (born 13 April 1972 in Oosterbeek), is a Dutch former footballer.

Career

Netherlands
Baart has extensive experience playing in the Eerste Divisie in the Netherlands, having played for TOP Oss, VVV-Venlo, SV Babberich, Fortuna Sittard. He was part of the VVV-Venlo team which won promotion to the Eredivisie at the end of the 2006/2007 season, before moving to and NEC; he spent the next four years in Nijmegen, but only made one league start for the team.

Canada
Baart was signed by coach Dwight Lodeweges to play for FC Edmonton in 2010, and played in several exhibition games prior to the team's first season in the North American Soccer League. He made his competitive debut for the team in their first official game on April 9, 2011, a 2-1 victory over the Fort Lauderdale Strikers.

At the end of the 2011 season, Edmonton announced that Baart had declined a contract offer and would not return to the club in 2012.

References

External links
 Voetbal International profile 

1972 births
Living people
People from Renkum
Footballers from Gelderland
Association football goalkeepers
Dutch footballers
Dutch expatriate footballers
FC Edmonton players
TOP Oss players
Fortuna Sittard players
NEC Nijmegen players
VVV-Venlo players
Eredivisie players
Eerste Divisie players
North American Soccer League players
Expatriate soccer players in Canada
Dutch expatriate sportspeople in Canada